Peter Joseph Triest (31 August 1760 – 24 June 1836) was a prelate of the Diocese of Ghent. He is known for his foundations of religious communities in this diocese.

Career 
He was born in Brussels and studied after his youth at the University of Louvain where he became bachelor of Philosophy. In he entered the major seminary of Mechelen, and was ordained priest in 1786 by cardinal de Frankenberg. He was made vicar of Hanswijk in Mechelen in 1792.

By request of Mgr Etienne Fallot de Beaumont he was incardinated in the diocese of Ghent, because the borders of the diocese had been altered. In 1807 he was made Canon of the Chapter of Saint Bavon in Ghent. He became the right and permission for the foundation of the Sisters of Charity of Jesus and Mary (1803), the Brothers of Charity (1807), the Brothers of St John of God (1825), and the Sisters of the Childhood of Jesus (1835).

Honours 
 1807: Honorary Canon of Saint-Bavon.
 1818: Knight of the Order of Orange-Nassau.
 1833: Knight of the Order of Leopold, by personal command of King Leopold I.

Bibliography
 Pierre De Decker, Levensbeschryving van Mijnheer den Kanonink Triest, Ghent, 1836
 Goswin de Stassart, Pierre-Joseph Triest, in: Biographie Universelle, Brussels, 1846
 "Monument élevé à la mémoire de Mr le chanoine Triest, dans l'église des SS. Michel et Gudule", Messager des sciences historiques, Ghent, 1850.
 A. M. Bocklandt, Kanunnik Triest, stichter van de Congregatie van de Zusters van Liefde van Jezus en Maria. Zijn Leven, zijn Geest, zijn Werken, Brussels, 1926 (Also: Vie et esprit du chanoine Triest, Brussels, 1928).
 G. Van den Gheyn, Pierre-Joseph Triest, in Biographie Nationale de Belgique, Académie Royale de Belgique, Brussels, 1932, vol. 25, col. 634–638.
 P. Loontjens, Ontstaan en Spiritualiteit van de religieuze stichtingen van kanunnik P. J. Triest, Ghent, 1957
 K. Reichgelt & L. Cnockaert, Kanunnik Petrus-Jozef Triest. Een levensschets, Menen, 1960
 J. Spanhove, "E. H. Petrus-Jozef Triest, desservant van Asse in 1791", Eigen Schoon en De Brabander, 1963, pp. 273–292
 Orest Claeys, "Petrus-Jozef Triest, pastoor te Ronse, 1797–1803", Annalen van de Geschiedkundige kring van Ronse, 1972, pp. 145–169.
 Lucienne Cnockaert, Pierre-Joseph Triest, le Vincent de Paul Belge, Leuven, 1974
 Encyclopedic Dictionary of Religion, Philadelphia-Washington, D.C. 1979, 3567.
 Donald Joyal, The Charism and Spirituality of Peter Joseph Triest, Rome, Gregorian Pontifical University, 1982.
 E. Geysen, Het verdienstelijk leven van Petrus-Jozef Triest in herinnering gebracht bij een bezoek aan monumenten en gebouwen. Triestrooute 1986, Ghent, 1986
 René STOCKMAN, Kanunik Petrus Jozef Triest, stichter en organisator, in: Gentsche Tijdinghen, Gent, 1996
Annuario Pontificio 1997, Vaticaan, 1997, pp. 1472 en 1512.
 René Stockman, De goede mijnheer Triest, een biografie van kanunnik Petrus Jozef Triest, Ghent, 1998 (also: Good Father Triest, A biography on Canon Peter Joseph Triest, Belgium. .
 Baudouin Walckiers, Filiations lignagères bruxelloises contemporaines, Brussels, 1999.
 Andries Van den Abeele, "De Romereis van Petrus Triest in 1816", Helpende Handen, 2000.
 Andries Van den Abeele, "De beginjaren van de Broeders van Liefde. Problemen van chronologie betreffende de aangestelde economen en oversten (december 1807 – november 1810)", Helpende Handen, 2001.
 René Stockman, Ethos of the Brothers of Charity, Ghent, 2002, revised 2006.
 René Stockman, in collaboration with Andries Van den Abeele, Liefde in actie. 200 jaar Broeders van Liefde, Davidsfonds, Leuven, 2006.
 René Stockman, Charity in action, 200 years Brothers of Charity, BOC Publications, Gent, 2009.
 René Stockman, Petrus Jozef Triest vandaag. Leven, spiritualiteit en inspiratiebron, Halewijn, Antwerp, 2009.

External links
 Petrus Triest in ODIS – Online Database for Intermediary Structures 

1760 births
1836 deaths
19th-century Belgian Roman Catholic priests
Brothers of Charity
Canons (priests)
Founders of Catholic religious communities
Old University of Leuven alumni
Recipients of the Order of the House of Orange
Roman Catholic priests of the Austrian Netherlands
Clergy from Ghent